Bos is a Dutch surname. Meaning "woods" or "forest", the name often is toponymic. Alternatively, the surname sometimes has a patronymic origin, referring to the now rare given name Bos. In 2007, 35,405 people carried the name in the Netherlands, making it the 14th most common surname there. Notable people with named Bos include:

Abraham Bos (born 1943), Dutch historian and philosopher
Annie Bos (1886–1975), Dutch theater and silent film actress
Bert Bos (born 1963), Dutch computer scientist
Brenda Bos (born 19..), American lutheran bishop in Evangelical Lutheran Church of America 
Burny Bos (born 1944), Dutch producer, scenarist and children's book writer
Caroline Bos (born 1959), Dutch architect
Coenraad V. Bos (1875–1955), Dutch classical pianist
Cornelis Bos (c.1508–1555), Flemish engraver, printseller and book publisher
Christiaan Bos, Dutch painter (1835–1918)
Cyril Bos (born 1972), French racing cyclist
Dianne Bos (born 1956), Canadian photographer
Ery Bos (1908–2005), Dutch-German dancer and film actress, daughter of Coenraad V. Bos
Frederik Bos (1866–1931), Dutch farmer and politician
Gijsbert Bos (born 1973), Dutch football forward
Hans Bos (born 1950), Dutch biochemist
Henk Bos (footballer) (born 1992), Dutch football midfielder
Henk Bos (painter) (1901–1979), Dutch painter
Henk J. M. Bos (born 1940), Dutch historian of mathematics
 (born 1953), Dutch footballer
Jan Bos (born 1975), Dutch speed skater & cyclist, brother of cyclist Theo Bos
Jan Just Bos (1939–2003), Dutch botanist, television presenter and rower
Jan Ritzema Bos (1850–1928), Dutch phytopathologist, brother of Pieter Roelof
Jane Bos (1897–1975), pseudonym of French film score composer Jane Malka
Johnny Bos (1952–2013), American boxer and writer
Kimberley Bos (born 1993), Dutch skeleton racer
Kirsten Bos (born c.1980), Canadian physical anthropologist
Lambert Bos (1670–1717), Dutch scholar and critic
Lex Bos (born 1957), Dutch field hockey goalkeeper
Loek Bos (born 1946), Dutch cartoonist, painter and sculptor
Marcelien Bos-de Koning (born 1978), Dutch competitive sailor
Marco Bos (born 1979), Dutch racing cyclist
Mark Bos (born 1960), Australian-rules footballer
Nel Bos (born 1947), Dutch swimmer
Peter Bos (born 1950), Dutch actor
Peter Bos (rower) (born 1938), American rower
 (1847–1902), Dutch teacher and atlas publisher, brother of Jan Ritzema
Renée Jones-Bos (born 1952), Dutch diplomat, Netherlands Ambassasor to Russia
Roel Bos (born 1942), Dutch movie actor with the stage name Glenn Saxson
 (born 1970), Dutch museum curator and art historian
Stef Bos (born 1961), Dutch pop singer active in South Africa
Tamara Bos (born 1967), Dutch screenwriter 
Theo Bos (born 1983), Dutch road and track cyclist, brother of speed skater Jan Bos
Theo Bos (footballer) (1965–2013), Dutch footballer and manager
Thomas Bos (born 1968), Dutch speed skater
Willemijn Bos (born 1988), Dutch field hockey player
Wouter Bos (born 1963), Dutch politician, leader of the Labour Party, PvdA

Fictional characters
Dick Bos, protagonist of the Dutch detective comics series by the same name

See also
Bosch (surname), surname with the same origin and pronunciation in Dutch
Van den Bos, surname
Frans ten Bos (1937–2016), English rugby player

References

Dutch-language surnames
Patronymic surnames
Dutch toponymic surnames‎